In mathematics, the Birkhoff–Grothendieck theorem classifies holomorphic vector bundles over the complex projective line.

Statement

More precisely, the statement of the theorem is as the following.

 

The notation implies each summand is a Serre twist some number of times of the trivial bundle. The representation is unique up to permuting factors.

Generalization 

Applications 
Since the only subvarieties are points, we have a complete classification of coherent sheaves.

See also

Algebraic geometry of projective spaces
Euler sequence
Splitting principle
K-theory
Jumping line

References

Further reading

Vector bundles
Theorems in projective geometry
Theorems in algebraic geometry
Theorems in complex geometry